Miss Malaysia World 2016, the 50th edition of Miss Malaysia World was held at the Corus Hotel, Kuala Lumpur on August 28, 2016. Brynn Zalina Lovett of Sabah crowned her successor Tatiana Kumar from Kuala Lumpur at the end of the contest. Twenty contestants from all across Malaysia competed for the crown. Tatiana represented Malaysia at Miss World 2016.

Results

Special awards

Contestants 
20 contestants competed for the crown and title.

Notes

Crossovers 
Contestants who previously competed/appeared at other national beauty pageants:

Miss Grand Malaysia
 2016 - Ranmeet Jassal (Winner)

Miss Cultural Harvest Festival
 2015 - Francisca Luhong James Bungan (2nd Runner-up)

Miss Earth Malaysia
 2015 - Amreet Kaur Sra  (1st Runner-up)

Miss Tourism Queen Malaysia
 2015 - Amreet Kaur Sra (Winner)

Miss Tourism Queen International
 2015 - Amreet Kaur Sra (Miss Elegance)

2016

References

External links
Miss World Malaysia website

Beauty pageants in Malaysia
2016 beauty pageants